Koleh Jub-e Sofla (also Romanized as Koleh Jūb-e Soflá; also known as Kalleh Jūb, Kalajūb, Kolajū, Koleh Jū, Koleh Jūb, and Kulāhju) is a village in Qaedrahmat Rural District, Zagheh District, Khorramabad County, Lorestan Province, Iran. At the 2006 census, its population was 328, in 65 families.

References 

Towns and villages in Khorramabad County